Adewale Dauda Wahab (born 4 October 1984 in Port Harcourt) is a Nigerian footballer who plays as a midfielder. Until end of the season 2010–11 he played for AC Bellinzona.

Career

Roma
Wahab started his European career with Italian club Reggiana, along with Obafemi Martins and other Nigerian players. Both players were signed by Italian giants Roma in July 2001, for 3 billion lire, while Giuseppe Di Masi moved in the opposite direction for 2.5 billion lire on a co-ownership deal. Wahab was loaned back to Reggiana in the 2001–02 season. He played for Roma's Primavera team in 2002–-03 season, and was promoted to the first team in the 2003–04 season, playing once in Serie A and once in the 2003–04 UEFA Cup, when he substituted Daniele De Rossi against FK Vardar. Wahab also played for Bologna in the 2001 .

He then spent three seasons loaned to clubs in the Italian lower divisions. Although he was loaned to other clubs, in 2006 his contract was extended from 2007 to 2009.

Bellinzona
In summer 2007, Wahab was signed by AC Bellinzona. In the 2009–10 season, he went to SE Eivissa-Ibiza and played a few friendlies. However, the transfer collapsed after the club was expelled from the league and re-admitted as the new club UD Ibiza-Eivissa in the regional league.

Wahab then played two league matches for Bellinzona, in October and November. In January 2010, he was dropped from the squad, but was later re-included in the team's official roster for the 2010–11 season.

References

External links
AC Bellinzona profile 

football.ch

1984 births
Living people
Nigerian Muslims
Nigerian footballers
Nigerian expatriate footballers
Nigeria international footballers
A.C. Reggiana 1919 players
A.S. Roma players
Ternana Calcio players
S.S. Teramo Calcio players
U.S. Catanzaro 1929 players
AC Bellinzona players
Serie A players
Serie B players
Swiss Super League players
Expatriate footballers in Italy
Expatriate footballers in Switzerland
Association football midfielders
Sportspeople from Port Harcourt